James John W. Fair (born 8 January 1981, in Chester) is an English former field hockey player who played as a goalkeeper.

He made his international debut in 2005, and has competed for England and Great Britain at numerous tournaments. He was selected to represent Great Britain in the 2008 Summer Olympics, although he did not play any matches. However, at the 2012 Summer Olympics he was Great Britain's first choice goalkeeper and started every match. Following Great Britain's defeat 3–1 defeat to Australia in the bronze playoff game, Fair was not one of the five Olympians selected for the England squad chosen to go to the 2012 Champions Trophy. In 2009 he was made goalkeeper of the year by the FIH.

From 1989 to 1999 he was educated at The King's School, Chester. He graduated from Birmingham University in 2003 in Geography and Geology. He used to work at Stowe School in Buckinghamshire He now works at King Edward's School, Birmingham in Birmingham, as a Geography Teacher.

References

External links
 
 
 
 

1981 births
Living people
English male field hockey players
Olympic field hockey players of Great Britain
British male field hockey players
Male field hockey goalkeepers
People educated at The King's School, Chester
2006 Men's Hockey World Cup players
2010 Men's Hockey World Cup players
Field hockey players at the 2012 Summer Olympics
Alumni of the University of Birmingham
Sportspeople from Cheshire
Cannock Hockey Club players
University of Birmingham Hockey Club players
Field hockey players at the 2006 Commonwealth Games
Commonwealth Games competitors for England